Dove-Myer Robinson Park, more commonly known as the Parnell Rose Garden, is a park  in Parnell, Auckland, New Zealand. The park is named after Dove-Myer Robinson, the longest-serving mayor of Auckland, who served for 18 years. There are over 5,000 roses in the garden. Some of the plants in the garden have been bred by internationally celebrated rose breeders.

The 'white garden' is a popular venue for weddings. As of 2010, the park was home to the oldest manuka and the largest pohutukawa tree in Auckland.

Each year in November, the park is host to the Parnell Festival of Roses, which showcases New Zealand craft stalls, art exhibitions, music, strolling performers and thousands of roses.

History 
The area was once known as Taurarua. It was included in the land made available by Ngati Whatua for the establishment of Auckland city in September 1840 .

In around 1905, what is now the Luxerose cafe, was built for Emily Gillies, the widow of Robert Gillies.  as a timber and shingle, Arts and Crafts style house, named “Kohanga”. It is likely to have been designed by Charles Le Neve Arnold, the architect of Auckland Grammar School.

In 1914 ratepayers voted by 815:575 for a £15,000 loan to buy  for a park. In 1915 a court settled the price at £16,125. The Gillies residence was converted to a tea house in 1925. Also in 1925, a controversial stone entrance was built.

Other additions include; The Netherlands War Memorial (1963), the Signals sculpture (1971),  the Dove-Myer Robinson Lookout Shelter (1981) and the Nancy Steen Garden (1984).  The gardens were renamed after the former mayor in 1981.

References

External links 
 Parnell Rose Gardens review Lonely Planet
 Photographs of Parnell Rose Gardens held in Auckland Libraries' heritage collections.

Parks in Auckland
Gardens in the Auckland Region
Parnell, New Zealand
Rose gardens
Waitematā Harbour